Viscera is a 2005 album by God Module.

Track listing
 The Source
 Inside Out
 False Pretense
 Still So Strange
 Lucid
 A Night Like This
 Sections
 Foreseen
 Lost Time
 Winter Torture
 A Simple Restriction

Track listing for limited edition 2nd CD
 Winter Torture (God Mod Dance Till You Die mix)
 Lucid (REAPER mix)
 Darkness is...
 The Source (IMPERATIVE REACTION mix)
 Altered Image
 Still So Strange (XENOGRAFT mix)

Remixes of songs found on CD1
Limited edition also includes different artwork

Released on Out Of Line

2005 albums